Gwen Barnard (1912–1988) was a British artist notable for her ability as a painter and printmaker.

Biography
Barnard studied at the Chelsea School of Art between 1931 and 1935 and then at the Euston Road School in 1937 and 1938. Although her early paintings were naturalistic and with time her approach became more abstract, throughout her career rock shapes and river scenes, particularly of the River Thames, remained constant themes. Barnard's first solo exhibition was at the Beaux Arts Gallery in London. She contributed works to group exhibitions and had further solo shows hosted by the Artists' International Association, at the Camden Arts Centre in 1976, the Upper Street Gallery in London and at overseas venues. Barnard was a member of the Women's International Art Club and served as the Club's chair for a time. She was also a member of the Royal Institute of Oil Painters. In 1955 she illustrated Shapes of the River, a book on the Thames. The book was published by the Gaberbocchus Press of which Barnard was a director and for whom she illustrated several volumes. For many years Barnard lived in Hampstead and wrote a history of the local Mall Studios, where she worked, for the Camden History Review in 1980.

References

1912 births
1988 deaths
20th-century British painters
20th-century British women artists
Alumni of Chelsea College of Arts
Artists from London
British women painters
Women book artists
Book artists